Youthworks College is a Bible college based at Moore College in Newtown, New South Wales. It offers diplomas for those interested in children's and youth ministry through the Australian College of Theology. Youthworks College is a ministry of the Anglican Diocese of Sydney.

Youthworks College was founded in 1999 and offers the Year13 theology course for school leavers and a three year diploma of Theology. The principal is Rev Dr Bill Salier.

References

External links

Seminaries and theological colleges in New South Wales
Bible colleges
Anglican Diocese of Sydney
Educational institutions established in 1999
Australian College of Theology
1999 establishments in Australia